D' Anothers is a 2005 Filipino comedy horror film directed by Joyce Bernal, story by Adolfo Alix Jr., and screenplay by Alix and Raymond Lee. The film tells the story of Hesus Resurreccion (Vhong Navarro), the protagonist who is afraid of ghosts, inherited an ancestral mansion that is abandoned and became a residence of ghosts within the past 100 years. For the ghosts, Hesus is "The One", meaning he is the one who will open a portal to the afterlife. It also stars Toni Gonzaga as Maan Tuken, the protagonist's girlfriend, John Prats as JC, a young man who visits the mansion with his love who is a ghost, and Tado as Atty. Reposo, the protagonist's lawyer.

D' Anothers was released by Star Cinema on July 27, 2005 and its director Joyce Bernal's second film where Vhong Navarro is the lead star after Mr. Suave (2003) and also, the first film where Navarro and Toni Gonzaga (her first film in Star Cinema after transferring to ABS-CBN) teamed up. Throughout its theatrical run, the film became a box-office success.

Plot
The Resurreccion's ancestral mansion is believed to have a portal to the other world. Every quarter of a century, it must be opened by a chosen member of the clan, known as "The One", to enable stranded ghosts to cross over to the afterlife. With no surviving clan member opening the portal in the past 100 years, ghosts have overcrowded the now-abandoned mansion and are in danger of becoming cockroaches unless they pass over.

Hesus Resurreccion (Vhong Navarro) is about to find out that he is The One but he is afraid of ghosts. When he inherits the mansion, he wants to sell it immediately but it isn't that easy since people believe the mansion is haunted. He totally freaks out when he learns that the people he sees in the mansion are all ghosts. Hesus has no choice but to fulfill his mission as The One. As he spends more time with the ghosts, he realizes that they are not scary at all and even enjoys their company.

In the end, Hesus got the key and opened the portal, but is later haunted by new ghosts who show up at the mansion.

Cast

Main cast
Vhong Navarro as Hesus Resurrecion
Toni Gonzaga as Maan Tuken

Supporting cast

 John Prats as JC
 Jhong Hilario as Gorio
 Dominic Ochoa as Nick
 Roxanne Guinoo as Titay
 Neri Naig as Rachelle
 Michelle Madrigal as Mayumi
 Joross Gamboa as Xavier
 Mura as Vic
 Pokwang as Valat
 Jaime Fabregas as Padre Florentino
 Jill Yulo as Angelica
 Arlene Muhlach as Kimberly
 Archie Alemania as Jograd
 Tado as Atty. Reposo
 Bella Flores as Precious
 Pinky Amador as Mrs. Tuken
 Dennis Padilla as Mr. Resurrecion
 Marjorie Barretto as Mrs. Resurrecion
 Mosang as Lotus Feet
 Jojit Lorenzo as George
 Piolo Pascual as himself
 Rufa Mae Quinto as herself
 Bidz Dela Cruz as Badet The Buyer
 Sarita Perez de Tagle

Production

Casting
D'Anothers served as the first film of Toni Gonzaga under Star Cinema after she was transferred to ABS-CBN from rival GMA Network in the same year as the film's release. Aside from Gonzaga, it is also the first film for Roxanne Guinoo, Neri Naig, Michelle Madrigal and Joross Gamboa, all of them are newly-discovered talents from the network's talent competition program Star Circle Quest (SCQ).

For Pokwang, who played the role of Valat, the film served as her first comedy horror film that she starred in and also, her second film under the film studio.

Release
D'Anothers was produced and distributed by Star Cinema and it was released in more than 100 cinemas nationwide on July 27, 2005.

The film received an international premiere at the 8th Far East Film Festival in Udine, Italy on April 21, 2006.

Reception

Box office
According to the report from the staff of the film studio, the film earned ₱10 million on its first day of theatrical showing. On the third week of its theatrical run, the film has reached its ₱100 million-mark in box-office, marking itself as a "blockbuster".

See also
 List of ghost films
 Star Cinema

References

External links
 

2005 films
2005 in the Philippines
Mosang films
2005 romantic comedy films
2005 comedy horror films
Philippine ghost films
Star Cinema films
Star Cinema comedy films
Philippine haunted house films
Philippine comedy horror films
Films directed by Joyce Bernal
Filipino-language films